Aline da Silva Ferreira (born 18 October 1986) is a female wrestler from Brazil. She became the 2014 Vice-World Champion in the 75 kg weight class.

Early life 
Ferreira first began learning judo as a teenager in her hometown of São Paulo, Brazil. After two years, she switched in 2001 to wrestling. She belongs to the Sesi Osasco São Paulo club and has primarily been trained by Alejo Morales. At 5 ft 8 in and weighing about 176 pounds, Ferreira wrestles in the heavyweight class.

Career
In 2011 at the Guadalajara Pan Am Games, Ferreira won silver in the 72 kg freestyle.

She won the silver medal the 2014 World Wrestling Championships in Tashkent, Uzbekistan and she became the first Brazilian wrestler to win a medal in World Wrestling Championships.

At 2015 World Wrestling Championships in Las Vegas, United States, Ferreira lost the bronze medal, but she was classified to 2016 Olympic Games in Rio de Janeiro, Brazil.

She represented Brazil at the 2020 Summer Olympics.

References

External links
 
 
 

1986 births
Living people
Brazilian female sport wrestlers
Sportspeople from São Paulo
World Wrestling Championships medalists
Olympic wrestlers of Brazil
Wrestlers at the 2016 Summer Olympics
Wrestlers at the 2020 Summer Olympics
Pan American Wrestling Championships medalists
Pan American Games medalists in wrestling
Pan American Games silver medalists for Brazil
Pan American Games bronze medalists for Brazil
Wrestlers at the 2011 Pan American Games
Wrestlers at the 2015 Pan American Games
Medalists at the 2011 Pan American Games
Medalists at the 2015 Pan American Games
South American Games gold medalists for Brazil
South American Games silver medalists for Brazil
South American Games medalists in wrestling
Competitors at the 2014 South American Games